Pierrette Dame (born 26 August 1936) is a French archer who represented France at the 1972 Summer Olympic Games in archery.

Career 

She competed in the 1972 Summer Olympic Games in the women's individual event and finished 31st with a score of 2196 points.

References

External links 

 Profile on worldarchery.org

1936 births
Living people
French female archers
Olympic archers of France
Archers at the 1972 Summer Olympics